Orthotylus virens is a species of bug from a family of Miridae that can be found in Austria, Baltic states (except for Lithuania), Bulgaria, Czech Republic, France, Germany, Moldova, Poland, Russia, Slovakia, Switzerland, Ukraine, Scandinavia, and Benelux (except for Belgium).

References

Insects described in 1807
Hemiptera of Europe
virens